The 2018 Women's Super 3s, known for sponsorship reasons as the 2018 Toyota Super 3s, was the fourth Women's Super 3s competition that took place in Ireland. It ran from May to September, with 3 teams taking part made up of the best players in Ireland. The teams played 10 matches each, four 50 over matches and six Twenty20s. Dragons won the competition, winning their second title.

Competition format
The three teams played ten matches each in a league system. Each team played the other two sides twice in a 50 over match and three times in a Twenty20 match, with all matches contributing to a unified table.

The league worked on a points system with positions being based on the total points. Points were awarded as follows:

Win: 2 points. 
Tie: 1 point. 
Loss: 0 points.
Abandoned/No Result: 1 point.

Squads

Source: Cricket Ireland

Points table

Source: CricketArchive

References

Women's Super Series
2018 in Irish cricket